Centralismo is the debut album by Sore. The album is ranked on number #40 in Rolling Stone Indonesia: 150 Greatest Indonesian Albums of All Time.

Track listing

Personnel
 Ade Firza Paloh - Guitar, vocals, backing vocals
 Reza Dwiputranto - Bass, cymbals, acoustic guitar, electric guitar, hand clapping, percussion, vocals, backing vocals
 Awan Garnida - Bass, vocals, backing vocals
 Ramondo Gascaro - Bells, clavinet, clogs, acoustic guitar, electric guitar, hand clapping, mellotron, music box, organ, piano, shahnai, synthesizer, synthesizer vibes, vibraphone, vocals, backing vocals
 Bemby Gusti Pramudya - Drums, vocals, backing vocals

References 

2005 debut albums
Sore (band) albums